In chemistry, a retained name is a name for a chemical compound that is recommended for use by a system of chemical nomenclature (for example, IUPAC nomenclature), but that is not fully systematic.
Retained names are often used for the most fundamental parts of a nomenclature system: almost all the chemical elements have retained names rather than being named systematically, as do the first four alkanes, benzene and most simple heterocyclic compounds. Water and ammonia are other examples of retained names.

Retained names may be either semisystematic or completely trivial; that is, they may contain certain elements of systematic nomenclature or none at all. Glycerol and acetic acid are examples of retained semisystematic names; furan and anisole are examples of retained trivial names.

References

External links 
Nomenclature of Organic Compounds (Recommendations 1993): Tables of trivial and semisystematic names retained for naming organic compounds

Chemical nomenclature